is a private university in Hirakata, Osaka, Japan. The predecessor of the school was founded in 1911, and it was chartered as a university in 1947. There is a hospital associated with the university located near Temmabashi Station in Chūō-ku, Osaka.

External links

 Official website 
  Official website 

Educational institutions established in 1911
Private universities and colleges in Japan
Universities and colleges in Osaka Prefecture
1911 establishments in Japan
Hirakata, Osaka
Dental schools in Japan